Carlos Ángel Peguero D'Oleo (born February 22, 1987) is a Dominican former professional baseball left fielder. He signed with the Seattle Mariners as an international free agent on January 20, 2005, with whom he made his Major League Baseball (MLB) debut in 2011, and has played in MLB for the Kansas City Royals, Texas Rangers and Boston Red Sox. He has also played in Nippon Professional Baseball (NPB) for the Tohoku Rakuten Golden Eagles and in the Korea Baseball Organization (KBO) for the LG Twins.

Professional career

Seattle Mariners
In  he finished tied for first in home runs with seven, tied for second in triples with seven, second in extra base hits with 24 and tied for ninth in average with .313 in the Arizona League. Peguero hit safely in 23 of 34 games. He hit a home run in his second at-bat of the season on June 23 against the Arizona League Angels. He went 3-for-4 with two runs, two home runs and two RBIs on June 30. He hit three home runs in a five-game span from July 29 to August 2. He recorded 11 multi-hit games, including three three-hit games and a season-high four hits on August 1. He had four games with season-high three RBIs. On August 8 he was promoted to the Rookie-level Everett AquaSox. At the end of the season he participated in the Mariners Arizona Fall League.

In , Peguero appeared in 79 games with the Single-A Wisconsin Timber Rattlers. He hit .407 during seven-game hitting streak from May 4–9. He went 3-for-5 with four RBIs on May 12. He recorded season-high eight-game hit streak, hitting .364, from June 11–21. He knocked in a career-high seven RBIs, going 3-for-5 with a two-run double, a three-run double and a three-run homer on June 15 against the Cedar Rapids Kernels. Peguero was on the disabled list with a left elbow strain from July 31 through the end of the season. He was named Wisconsin's Most Valuable Player by the Seattle Mariners. He participated in the Mariners' 2007 Arizona Fall League and played in the Dominican Winter League.

Peguero spent the  season with High Desert. He had 17 multi-RBI games, including a season-high four RBIs on April 3. He recorded a season-high four hits on June 17. Peguero was placed on the disabled list on July 17 for the remainder of the season, with a sprained left wrist. He participated in the Mariners' Advance Development League in Peoria, Arizona.

Kansas City Royals
The Kansas City Royals acquired Peguero from the Seattle Mariners on January 29, 2014 for cash considerations. The Royals designated him for assignment on March 25, 2014, after they acquired Patrick Schuster off waivers, in the hopes that Peguero would clear waivers so they could assign him to the Omaha Storm Chasers. He was released by the Royals on December 19, 2014.

Texas Rangers

Peguero signed a minor league deal with the Texas Rangers on January 13, 2015. He was called up on April 11, and made his Rangers debut the same day. He was designated for assignment on May 20.

Boston Red Sox
On May 27, 2015, the Boston Red Sox acquired Peguero for cash considerations. On June 4, Peguero was designated for assignment, but rejoined the team by signing a minor league contract on June 15.

St. Louis Cardinals
The St. Louis Cardinals announced on January 22, 2016, that they signed Peguero to a minor league deal with an invitation to major league spring training camp.  His minor league totals in 10 previous seasons included a .273 average, .335 OBP and .511 SLG.  The Cardinals assigned him to the Triple-A Memphis Redbirds of the Pacific Coast League, where he batted .283, .355 OBP and .435 SLG.

Tohoku Rakuten Golden Eagles
The Cardinals sold Peguero's contract to the Tohoku Rakuten Golden Eagles of Nippon Professional Baseball (NPB) on July 8, 2016.

On July 12, 2017, Peguero  hit a home run with distance of 513 ft (156.4 m) at the Fukuoka Yahuoku! Dome.

Toros de Tijuana
On June 4, 2019, Peguero signed with the Toros de Tijuana of the Mexican League. He appeared in 22 games and slashed .259/.362/.482 with 5 home runs and 14 RBIs.

LG Twins
On July 10, 2019, Peguero signed with the LG Twins of the KBO League. He became a free agent following the season.

Pericos de Puebla
On February 19, 2020, Peguero signed with the Pericos de Puebla of the Mexican League. Peguero was released by the Pericos on June 25, 2020 without appearing in a game.

Personal life
Peguero is married to Maria Jacqueline (née Borbón) Peguero, the youngest daughter of former major league relief pitcher Pedro Borbón, and sister of Pedro Borbón, Jr., also a former major league relief pitcher.

References

External links

1987 births
Living people
Arizona League Mariners players
Boston Red Sox players
Dominican Republic expatriate baseball players in Japan
Dominican Republic expatriate baseball players in Mexico
Dominican Republic expatriate baseball players in South Korea
Dominican Republic expatriate baseball players in the United States
Dominican Republic national baseball team players
Everett AquaSox players
High Desert Mavericks players
Kansas City Royals players
LG Twins players
Major League Baseball left fielders
Major League Baseball players from the Dominican Republic
Memphis Redbirds players
Mexican League baseball first basemen
Mexican League baseball right fielders
Nippon Professional Baseball right fielders
Omaha Storm Chasers players
Pawtucket Red Sox players
People from Hondo Valle
Round Rock Express players
Seattle Mariners players
Tacoma Rainiers players
Texas Rangers players
Tohoku Rakuten Golden Eagles players
Toros de Tijuana players
West Tennessee Diamond Jaxx players
Wisconsin Timber Rattlers players
2019 WBSC Premier12 players
Gigantes del Cibao players
Tigres del Licey players